The Indian locomotive class XS was a class of experimental four-cylinder  "Pacific" type steam locomotives used on  broad gauge lines in British India, and then in post-partition Pakistan.

The four members of the class were built by Vulcan Foundry in Newton-le-Willows, Lancashire, England, in 1930.  They were divided into two sub-classes, XS1 and XS2, each made up of two locomotives.  Upon the partition of India in 1947, they all went to Pakistan.

See also

Rail transport in India#History
History of rail transport in Pakistan
Indian Railways
Locomotives of India
Pakistan Railways

References

Notes

Bibliography

Railway locomotives introduced in 1930
XS
XS
Vulcan Foundry locomotives
4-6-2 locomotives
5 ft 6 in gauge locomotives
Passenger locomotives
Scrapped locomotives